This is a list of Illinois companies which includes notable companies that are headquartered in Illinois, or were previously headquartered in Illinois. In general, this list does not include companies headquartered in one of the municipalities of the Chicago metropolitan area.

Companies based in Illinois

A
 Abbott Laboratories 
 Abbvie 
Abt Electronics 
 Alliant Credit Union 
 Allstate 
 Alton Steel 
 American River Transportation Company 
Anixter 
 Archer Daniels Midland 
 Astro-Physics 
 Axium Foods

B
 Basler Electric 
 Beer Nuts 
 Believers Broadcasting Corporation 
 Bell Sports 
Belly (loyalty program) 
BMO Harris Bank 
BenchPrep 
 Black Dog Books 
 Boeing 
Braintree (company) 
 Brewer Investment Group 
 Brown County State Bank 
 Bunn-O-Matic Corporation 
 Busey Bank
Byline Bank

C
 Cars.com 
 Caterpillar Inc. 
 CDW 
Citadel LLC 
 Citizens Equity First Credit Union 
 City Water, Light & Power 
Conagra Brands 
 Consolidated Communications
 Country Financial 
 Credit Union 1

D
 Dawn Equipment Company 
 Daxcon 
 Detonics 
 Discover Financial 
Donnelley Financial Solutions 
 Dot Foods
Dover Corporation

E
 Eli Bridge Company 
 Elliott Aviation 
 Estwing

F
 Federal Signal Corporation 
Ferrara Candy Company 
First Midwest Bancorp 
Fieldglass 
 Follett Corporation 
 The Frantz Manufacturing Company 
 Frasca International

G
 Gardner Denver 
 GE Healthcare
 Glik's 
Gogo Inflight Internet 
GoHealth 
Golub Capital 
 Great Planes Model Manufacturing 
 Greenlee 
 Group O 
 Growmark 
 Groupon
Grubhub
GTCR

H
 Harrisonville Telephone Company 
 Horace Mann Educators Corporation 
 Horizon Hobby
Hyatt

I
 Ideal Industries 
 Illinois National Bank
IMC Financial Markets
Invenergy
Illinois Tool Works

J
 Jimmy John's 
JLL (company) 
 John Deere

K
 Kress Corporation
Kraft Foods

L
 Legacy Audio 
 Levi, Ray & Shoup 
 Lewis Machine and Tool Company
Lightbank

M
 Maui Jim 
Madison Dearborn Partners 
 Meatheads Burgers & Fries 
 Metropolitan Educational Enterprises
 Monical's Pizza 
 Morton Salt 
Morningstar, Inc. 
 Motorola Mobility
Motorola Solutions
 Mrs. Fisher's 
 McDonald's

N
 Nalco Holding Company 
 National Railway Equipment Company 
 Navistar International
Northern Trust
Nuveen

P
 Pacific Bearing Company 
Pactiv
ParkWhiz 
 Peoria Charter Coach Company 
 Pioneer Railcorp 
 Plochman's
Portillo's Restaurants
Potbelly Sandwich Shop
Peapod

Q
 QCR Holdings 
 Quincy Media

R
 RLI Corp. 
RR Donnelley 
 Road Ranger 
 Rock River Arms 
 Rural King

S
 Sears & Roebuck
Shakespeare Squared 
 Shaw Media 
Skidmore, Owings & Merrill 
SpotHero 
 Springfield Armory, Inc. 
 STARadio Corporation 
 State Farm 
 Suburban Express

T
 Testor Corporation 
Thoma Bravo 
 Titan Tire Corporation 
 Tower Hobbies 
 Trend Is Dead! Records 
 Tri-State Christian Television

U
 United Airlines
Uptake (business)

V
 Volition
Vivid Seats

W
 Wahl Clipper 
Walgreens Boots Alliance 
 Western Cartridge Company 
West Monroe Partners 
 Wicks Organ Company 
 Wiss, Janney, Elstner Associates, Inc. 
 Wolfram Research, Inc.
 Wrigley Company

Z
Zebra Technologies

Companies formerly based in Illinois

A
 A. E. Staley
 ArmaLite 
 Aventine Renewable Energy

D
 DeKalb Genetics Corporation

H
 Hilander Foods 
 Hobbico

N
 Nortrax

R
 Ryan International Airlines

S
 Sundstrand Corporation

See also
 List of breweries in Illinois
 List of casinos in Illinois
 List of companies in the Chicago metropolitan area
 List of newspapers in Illinois
 List of wineries in Illinois

References

 
Illinois